Max Eberl (born 21 September 1973) is a German professional football executive and a former player who works as RB Leipzig's director of sport.

Playing career
Born in Bogen, Eberl's career as a professional footballer began in 1991 as a defender with Bayern Munich. A highly rated youngster, he represented Germany at the 1993 FIFA World Youth Championship in Australia. During the tournament he started the group games against Ghana and Portugal.

After making only one Bundesliga appearance in two years at Munich, Eberl dropped down a division to the 2. Bundesliga to play for VfL Bochum. Eberl spent four seasons at Bochum, split evenly between the top two divisions, before moving to Greuther Fürth. He spent only 18 months playing for Greuther Fürth before moving to Borussia Mönchengladbach halfway through the 1998–99 season. Eberl saw out the rest of his career with Mönchengladbach, retiring in 2005. In a career lasting over 200 games in the first and second Bundesliga, Eberl did not score a single goal.

Coaching and managing career
Eberl was appointed as the head of Borussia Mönchengladbach's youth and amateur football programs shortly after his retirement in 2005. In 2008, he took up the job as Borussia's director of sport. He retired in 2022, and then became director of sport at RB Leipzig.

References

External links

1973 births
Living people
German footballers
Germany youth international footballers
Germany under-21 international footballers
Bundesliga players
2. Bundesliga players
FC Bayern Munich footballers
FC Bayern Munich II players
VfL Bochum players
SpVgg Greuther Fürth players
Borussia Mönchengladbach players
Association football defenders
Borussia Mönchengladbach non-playing staff